
Braniewo County is a unit of territorial administration and local government (powiat) in Warmian-Masurian Voivodeship, northern Poland, on the border with Russia. It came into being on January 1, 1999, as a result of the Polish local government reforms passed in 1998.

As of 2019 its total population is 41,223, out of which the population of Braniewo is 17,875, that of Pieniężno is 2,271, that of Frombork is 2,332, and the rural population is 19,130.

Neighbouring counties
Braniewo County is bordered by Bartoszyce County and Lidzbark County to the east, and Elbląg County to the south-west. It also borders Russia (Kaliningrad Oblast) to the north.

Administrative division
The county is subdivided into seven gminas (one urban, two urban-rural and four rural). These are listed in the following table, in descending order of population.

References

 
Braniewo